Chris Walton may refer to:

Chris Walton (cricketer) (1933-2006), English cricketer
 Chris Walton (businessman) (born 1957), chairman of KazMunayGas and former CFO of Easyjet